The Edward S. Kearney House is a historic house located at 9 New Jersey Route 18 in the Westons Mills section of East Brunswick in Middlesex County, New Jersey. It was added to the National Register of Historic Places on April 6, 1979, for its significance in architecture and commerce, one of only two historic taverns in the township.

History and description
Edward S. Kearney immigrated from Ireland in the 1840s and bought property at Westons Mills in the early 1850s. He soon built this two and one-half story frame house. In 1886, he sold it to Barthy McGough, who converted it into a hotel and inn, first known as McGough's Tavern, and then the Cosmopolitan Hotel. The business operated nearly fifty years. McGough, from New York City, also owned a bar and restaurant in New Brunswick near the train station.

See also
 National Register of Historic Places listings in Middlesex County, New Jersey

References

East Brunswick, New Jersey
National Register of Historic Places in Middlesex County, New Jersey
Houses on the National Register of Historic Places in New Jersey
Hotel buildings on the National Register of Historic Places in New Jersey
Houses in Middlesex County, New Jersey
1855 establishments in New Jersey
Houses completed in 1855
Taverns in New Jersey
New Jersey Register of Historic Places